Conrad I of Oldenburg (died 1347) was the Count of Oldenburg from 1344 to 1347. He succeeded his brother, John III of Oldenburg.

He was the son of John II of Oldenburg and Hedwig of Diepholz. Conrad married Ingeborg, the daughter of Count Gerhard IV of Holstein-Plön. They had four children:
Conrad II, Count of Oldenburg (died 1401)
Gerard of Oldenburg (died 1368); killed in action while invading Rüstringen. 
Agnes of Oldenburg; married Count Ludwig von Winstorf 
Christian V, Count of Oldenburg (1342–1399)

References

Counts of Oldenburg
Year of birth missing
1367 deaths